Ōkyo is a crater on Mercury.  Its name was adopted by the International Astronomical Union (IAU) in 1985.  It is named for the Japanese painter Maruyama Ōkyo, who lived from 1733 to 1795.

To the southeast of Ōkyo is the crater Camões.

References

Impact craters on Mercury